This article contains information related to recordings by American composer, arranger, producer, instrumentalist, and singer-songwriter Van Dyke Parks.

Studio albums

Live album

Singles

Compilation albums

Appearances

Besides multiple projects with Brian Wilson, he has worked with such notable performers as Phil Ochs, Tim Buckley, Haruomi Hosono, The Byrds, Loudon Wainwright III, Rufus Wainwright, Harry Nilsson, Randy Newman, The Chills, Ry Cooder, Joanna Newsom, Grizzly Bear, Inara George, Silverchair, Keith Moon, Frank Zappa, Ringo Starr, Delaney Bramlett, Vic Chesnutt, U2, Cher, Sam Phillips, Frank Black, The Beau Brummels, The Manhattan Transfer, Medicine, Sixpence None the Richer, Carly Simon, Little Feat, T-Bone Burnett, Stan Ridgway, Toad the Wet Sprocket, Victoria Williams, Peter Case, Gordon Lightfoot, Fiona Apple, Sheryl Crow, Natalie Merchant, The Everly Brothers, Saint Etienne, The Thrills, Scissor Sisters, Laurie Anderson, Bonnie Raitt, Judy Collins, Susanna Hoffs, and Matthew Sweet.

Production

External links

References

Discographies of American artists
Pop music discographies
Production discographies
Incomplete music lists
Discography